Somalodromius basilewskyi is a species of beetle in the family Carabidae, the only species in the genus Somalodromius.

References

Lebiinae